Phil Rickman (also known under the pen names of Thom Madley and Will Kingdom) is a British author of supernatural and mystery novels.

Biography
Rickman was born in Lancashire in the north of England and worked as a journalist for BBC World Service TV and BBC Radio 4. He published his first book, Candlenight, in 1991, and began his Merrily Watkins in 1998. In 2010, he began the John Dee Papers series, which focuses on the Welsh mathematician and astrologer, John Dee. 

Rickman has also worked on several music albums based upon his books and has helped write many of the albums' songs. He has lived in Wales most of his life and now resides (as of 2020) with his wife in Hay-on-Wye.

In his writing, Rickman states that he performs research into the folklore, religion, and supernatural themes of his books, citing that "If I can't believe it, it doesn't go in". He has also voiced his unhappiness over his earlier critics which labeled him a horror writer. He states that he felt that the books did not fit neatly within that genre.

Bibliography

Standalone novels
Candlenight (1991)
Crybbe (Curfew in the United States) (1993) 
The Man in the Moss (1994)
December (1994)
The Chalice (1997)
The Cold Calling (1998, as Will Kingdom)
Mean Spirit (2001, as Will Kingdom)
Night After Night (2014)

John Dee Papers
The Bones of Avalon (2010) 
The Heresy of Dr Dee (2012)

Marco series
Marco's Pendulum (2006, as Thom Madley)
Marco and the Blade of Night (2007, as Thom Madley)

Merrily Watkins series
The Wine of Angels (1998)
Midwinter of the Spirit (1999)
A Crown of Lights (2001)
The Cure of Souls (2001)
The Lamp of the Wicked (2002)
The Prayer of the Night Shepherd (2004)
The Smile of a Ghost (2005)
The Remains of an Altar (2006) 
The Fabric of Sin (2007)
To Dream of the Dead (2008)
The Secrets of Pain (2011)
The Magus of Hay (2013)
Friends of the Dusk (2015)
All of a Winter's Night (2017)
The Fever of the World (2022)

Short stories
The House of Susan Lulham - was first published in the Oxfam "Oxcrimes" anthology (May 2014). In December 2014, an extended version which is "five times as long" was published for Kindle.

Non-fiction
Merrily's Border: The Places in Herefordshire & the Marches Behind the Merrily Watkins Novels (with photographer John Mason) (2009)

Discography
Songs from Lucy's Cottage (2009, by Lol Robinson and Hazey Jane II) 
A Message from the Morning (2010, by Lol Robinson and Hazey Jane II)
Abbey Tapes: the Exorcism (2011, by Philosopher's Stone, based upon the novel December)

Television

The second Merrily book Midwinter of the Spirit (which is the first "Exorcism" story) has been made into a three-part TV drama by ITV. The Cast includes Anna Maxwell-Martin as Merrily, Sally Messham as Jane, and David Threlfall as Huw Owen. It was released in late 2015.

References

External links 
 
 

Year of birth missing (living people)
Living people
Anglo-Welsh novelists
British fantasy writers
British horror writers
British mystery writers